Leo Edgar Hafford  (September 17, 1883 – October 1, 1911) was a professional baseball player who played pitcher in the major leagues. He attended Tufts University and Bowdoin College, and went on to coach football at the University of Connecticut in 1911. He served as head coach only briefly, as he died from typhoid fever three weeks after accepting the position. He coached only coaching one game, but was credited as head coach for the whole season.

Head coaching record

References

External links

1883 births
1911 deaths
Major League Baseball pitchers
Cincinnati Reds players
Rochester Bronchos players
Trenton Tigers players
Baltimore Orioles (IL) players
Lancaster Red Roses players
Troy Trojans (minor league) players
UConn Huskies football coaches
Tufts University alumni
Sportspeople from Somerville, Massachusetts
Baseball players from Massachusetts
Deaths from typhoid fever
Plattsburgh (baseball) players
Addison-Wellsville Tobacco Strippers players